The Barak Missile scandal was a case of alleged defence corruption relating to the purchase of Barak 1 Missile Systems by India from Israel. The Central Bureau of Investigation (CBI) investigated the case and several people including the Samata Party ex-treasurer R. K. Jain were arrested. Others named in the First Information Report (FIR) included politicians George Fernandes, Jaya Jaitley, along with arms dealer and ex-naval officer Suresh Nanda, who is the son of retired Chief of the Naval Staff S.M. Nanda. The CBI investigated the case and filed a First Information Report (FIR) on 10 October 2006. On 24 December 2013, after investigating for more than seven years, the CBI decided to close the case as it did not find any evidence on the allegations.

On 23 December 2013, Defence Ministry headed by AK Antony approved the procurement of additional 262 Barak missiles. The sting operation "Operation West End" started by Tehelka in 2001 which showed corruption in various defence deals led to the scandal. The Bharatiya Janta Party demanded that the CBI should take action against Tehelka for "misleading and fabricating false evidence" in the case.

Background
The Barak missile system was jointly developed by Israel Aircraft Industries (IAI) and RAFAEL Armament Development Authority of Israel. On 23 October 2000, contracts had been signed by the Indian government to procure seven Barak systems at a total cost $199.50 million and 200 missiles at a cost of $69.13 million. This was done despite objections raised by several groups, including members of the team that had originally visited Israel to observe the missile performance, and 
APJ Abdul Kalam, then heading the Defence Research Development Organization. 
Though some of the objections were of a procedural nature, the Navy Chief of Staff Sushil Kumar is currently under investigation as to why these
objections were not considered.

In 2001, "Operation West End", a sting operation conducted by Tehelka, alleged that 15 defence deals made by the government had involved some sort of kickback and the Barak missile deal was one of them. Transcripts of conversations between the undercover Tehelka operative and R. K. Jain indicate that Jain accepted bribes from Suresh Nanda in the amount of ten million.

Investigations

The NDA government set up a commission to investigate the matter. The UPA government, rejected the partial report by the commission and the Central Bureau of Investigation (CBI) began investigating the case. The CBI lodged a First Information Report (FIR) on 9 October 2006 and claimed that George Fernandes the Indian defence minister at that time, and the Former Chief of the Indian Navy, Admiral Sushil Kumar were involved. The FIR notes that the Indian Defence Research & Development Organization had sought to block the import of the Barak system right until the end. The FIR restates R.K. Jain's admission to Tehelka that three per cent of this cost went to Fernandes and Jaya Jaitley as commission, while he himself was given 0.5 per cent. These commissions were paid to them by Suresh Nanda, the middleman in the deal, according to the Tehelka tapes.

Suresh Nanda, his son Sanjeev Nanda, and two others were arrested on 9 March 2008 under section 120-B (criminal conspiracy) and section 201 (committing offence to cause disappearing of evidence) related to the scandal.

On 24 December 2013, after investigating for more than seven years, the CBI closed the case and filed a report in a court as it did not find any evidence on the allegations. A day before, on 23 December, Defence Ministry headed by AK Antony approved the procurement of additional 262 Barak missiles. The BJP responded by saying: "This is the same case 'created' by Tehelka in 2001 to defame and discredit the then BJP-led NDA government" and demanded that the CBI should take action against Tehelka for "misleading and fabricating false evidence" in the case.

References

2006 scandals
Corruption in defence procurement in India
Weapons trade
2000s in India
2000s in Israel